Micranthes stellaris, synonym Saxifraga stellaris, the starry saxifrage or hairy kidney-wort, is an Arctic–alpine species in the family Saxifragaceae. One subspecies is found from eastern Canada to Russia, including the British Isles, while another is found in the mountains of southern Europe.

Description

The leaves are toothed and somewhat fleshy, ovate or obovate, and without an obvious petiole.

The anthers are also red or yellow. Flowers are borne from June to August.

They are elliptic, ovoid or reniform in shape, with longitudinal ribs bearing spines. M. stellaris has a chromosome number of 2n = 28.

Taxonomy
Micranthes stellaris was first described by Carl Linnaeus in his 1753 work Species Plantarum as Saxifraga stellaris. Linnaeus noted the species' occurrence in the mountains of Spitsbergen, Lapland, Switzerland, Styria and Westmorland. The nominate subspecies, Micranthes stellaris subsp. stellaris is the northern subspecies, occurring from Canada to Russia, including the British Isles. The subspecies in the Alpide belt and other mountains in southern Europe is often called M. stellaris subsp. alpigena, but an older name has priority – M. stellaris subsp. robusta. The name M. stellaris subsp. prolifera is used for plants from the south-eastern Alps which have few flowers but produce bulbils along the stems.

Distribution and ecology

Micranthes stellaris has an Arctic–alpine distribution. It is found from Baffin Island, Labrador and Greenland to Arctic Russia, including Iceland, Scandinavia and the British Isles. Further south, it is found from the Sierra Nevada in southern Spain to the eastern Carpathians, including lower ranges such as the Massif Central.

In the Arctic, M. stellaris may occur down to sea level. Within the British Isles, M. stellaris  is abundant in North Wales, Northern England and Scotland, reaching the summit of Ben Nevis, but is only found locally in Ireland. Its southernmost stations in Great Britain are the slopes of Plynlimon and the Rheidol valley; it does not occur in the mountains of South Wales.

Micranthes stellaris lives in damp environments, such as wet flushes, beside streams or springs, or on wet rock ledges. It is self-compatible, but its flowers are protandrous, and are usually pollinated by flies.

References

External links

stellaris
Flora of Northern Europe
Flora of Subarctic America
Flora of Southwestern Europe
Alpine flora
Plants described in 1753
Taxa named by Carl Linnaeus